Randolph Air Force Base CDP is a census-designated place (CDP) covering the permanent residential population of the Randolph Air Force Base in Bexar County, Texas, United States. Per the 2020 census, the population was 1,280.

Demographics

2020 census

Note: the US Census treats Hispanic/Latino as an ethnic category. This table excludes Latinos from the racial categories and assigns them to a separate category. Hispanics/Latinos can be of any race.

References

Census-designated places in Bexar County, Texas